Union is the thirteenth studio album by English progressive rock band Yes, released on 30 April 1991 by Arista Records. Production began following the amalgamation of two bands that featured previous and then current members of Yes: Anderson Bruford Wakeman Howe (ABWH), consisting of vocalist Jon Anderson, drummer Bill Bruford, keyboardist Rick Wakeman and guitarist Steve Howe, and Yes, comprised at that time of bassist and vocalist Chris Squire, guitarist and vocalist Trevor Rabin, keyboardist Tony Kaye and drummer Alan White. The eight musicians signed with Arista and a combination of unfinished tracks by both groups were selected for Union. The album's sessions were problematic from the start, including disagreements between some of the musicians regarding the "merger" of the two bands, strained relations during the recording process, and decisions by the production team of Anderson and producer Jonathan Elias to bring in session musicians to re-record parts that Wakeman and Howe had originally completed.

Union was released to a decidedly mixed critical reception, and the majority of the band have openly stated their dislike of the material. Despite all this, it fared relatively well commercially, reaching No. 7 in the UK and No. 15 in the US. After two months, Union was certified gold by the Recording Industry Association of America (RIAA) for selling 500,000 copies. The first single, "Lift Me Up", was number one on the Billboard Hot Mainstream Rock Tracks chart for six weeks. Howe's acoustic guitar piece "Masquerade" received a Grammy Award nomination for Best Rock Instrumental Performance. Yes supported Union with their 1991–1992 ‘Around the World in 80 Dates’ show that featured all eight members playing on stage; Bruford, Wakeman, and Howe left the band after the tour.

Background 
In 1983, Yes had reformed with singer Jon Anderson joining bassist Chris Squire and drummer Alan White, who were working on new material with guitarist/singer/songwriter Trevor Rabin. Original Yes keyboardist Tony Kaye rounded out the group, and the five went on to record the group's most commercially successful albums, 90125 (1983) and Big Generator (1987), for Atco Records. In 1988, Anderson left Yes and formed Anderson Bruford Wakeman Howe (ABWH), a group with former Yes members Bill Bruford, Rick Wakeman, Steve Howe and Bruford's former King Crimson bandmate Tony Levin on bass guitar. ABWH released their self-titled album for Arista Records in 1989 and supported it with a world tour. During this time, the four remaining Yes members began to write songs with former Yes producer Eddy Offord and held auditions for a new lead singer, including Supertramp vocalist Roger Hodgson and Billy Sherwood of World Trade. Sherwood went on to become a longtime collaborator with Yes, firstly as a live musician and producer; he became their full-time bassist following Squire's death in 2015.

In 1990, ABWH started work on a second album at Studio Miraval in Correns, France with producer Jonathan Elias, for whom Anderson had contributed lyrics and vocals to Requiem for the Americas (1990). Bruford has praised the material that Howe, Tony Levin and he were developing prior to Anderson's involvement, and had high hopes for ABWH's creative future. The atmosphere changed when Arista asserted that none of their new material was suitable for radio airplay. After the backing tracks had been put down, Anderson went to Los Angeles to record some of his vocals. He also reunited with Rabin and heard some songs that Yes were working on. Anderson suggested that he could add lead vocals to them, in addition to asking Rabin for a song that ABWH could record for their album. "What I read into that was they needed a single", recalled Rabin, who was primarily responsible for Yes's hit singles of the 1980s. Rabin gave Anderson three demos, one of which was "Lift Me Up", but requested that ABWH record only one. Anderson wished to record all three, which became the impetus for discussions amongst management of Yes and ABWH that "joining forces" and making an album together would prove the most beneficial arrangement.

The combination of the two bands received mixed internal reactions. Rabin thought the idea was "useful and convenient to everyone, because we wanted to go on the road, and it was a quick way". Squire called Yes's involvement in the ABWH project a "salvage job". Howe and Bruford both resisted, seeing no need to "become Yes" once again as they felt they had reached substantial success as ABWH. Bruford added that ABWH "was a group in the making", but "the politicians got involved and that idea was quickly crushed." Following a period of negotiations Atco agreed to release Yes, thus allowing everyone to sign a four-album deal with Arista. This gave the green-light for an album that combined tracks recorded separately by both groups, with Anderson on vocals. As part of the deal, Atco retained the rights to the band's back catalogue. Squire remembered a "huge, 90-page contract" was produced to settle the various legal issues between the two bands, labels, and promoters. The album's original title was Dialogue, which was announced in the press as late as February 1991, while the album was being mixed.

Recording and production 
Union includes nine tracks recorded by ABWH, these being "I Would Have Waited Forever", "Shock to the System", "Without Hope You Cannot Start the Day", "Silent Talking", "Angkor Wat", "Dangerous (Look in the Light of What You're Searching For)", "Holding On", "Evensong", and "Take the Water to the Mountain" Collectively they were recorded in five different studios, including Studio Guillaume Tell in Paris, SARM West Studios in London, Record Plant Studios in Los Angeles and Vision Sound Studios in New York City. Howe recorded "Masquerade" by himself in Langley Studios at his home in Devon, England. "Evensong" featured only Bruford and Tony Levin on Chapman Stick.

The remaining four tracks were produced by Yes: "Lift Me Up", "Saving My Heart", "Miracle of Life", and "The More We Live – Let Go". According to White, Yes had roughly three months to finish their tracks. The majority of the bass parts on the album are played by Tony Levin (on both bass guitar & Chapman Stick), with Squire only playing bass on "Lift Me Up", "Saving My Heart" and "Miracle of Life". Sherwood played the bass on "The More We Live- Let Go". Squire sang backing vocals on the four tracks Yes produced, as well as several of the ABWH-produced tracks, including "I Would Have Waited Forever", "Without Hope (You Cannot Start the Day)" and "Dangerous (Look in the Light of What You're Searching For)".

The number of people who worked on the album is highly unusual. There are seven different producers, roughly 17 recording engineers and mixers, six backing singers, nine synthesizer player/programmers and no less than four additional musicians who added parts as well. This is the only album in the Yes discography to feature participation from this many individuals who were not in Yes, or part of a regular, much smaller production team. Consequently, four pages of the album's CD booklet are dedicated to the song credits.

Issues with ABWH tracks

When Elias accepted Anderson's invitation to produce the ABWH tracks, with Anderson credited as an associate producer, Elias felt uneasy about the task as a Yes album of "fresh" material was something he thought was too difficult to achieve, following the band's history of internal conflict. He aimed to present the "high technical edge" that Yes were known for, within the structure of more concise and direct songs and not spotlight only technical prowess. Anderson initially resisted this approach as he wished to distance himself from the more commercial music that had largely defined Yes across the previous decade. When recording began, Elias recalled a lack of solid material and the tension between Anderson and Howe especially, including the refusal of the two to stay in the studio while the other was present. Elias tried to help stimulate creativity and brought in a Hammond organ, but said Wakeman refused as he thought the instrument was outdated. Elias concluded that ABWH "didn't care about a note of music", and was relieved to have finished some of the material at all, considering the difficulties and his personal dislike for some of the songs.

Matters complicated further when ABWH had started to put takes down. Wakeman and Howe had both agreed to solo commitments prior to recording, so their respective keyboard and guitar tracks were stored onto a computer, but not finalised and mastered. In their absence, Elias and Anderson brought in session musicians to play new arrangements from the initial takes as they were dissatisfied with what Wakeman and Howe had played. Elias said, "We weren't looking for only the early-'70s 'pyro technique'. We wanted something more modern". Among the 11 additional keyboard and synthesiser players featured on Union is Jim Crichton of Saga. Crichton and his assistant Brian Foraker were given songs that needed work and the pair "tried to fill in the gaps" at Crichton's own studio by playing parts that they thought Wakeman might play under those circumstances. Crichton felt "Dangerous" was a particularly strong track in demo form, but that the final version on the album was substandard. Rabin was invited to replace Howe's parts, but turned down the opportunity. Recordings were made with session guitarist Scott van Zen, but ultimately the parts in question were replaced by Jimmy Haun, who was suggested by Steve Porcaro and had worked in Squire's band The Chris Squire Experiment. Haun later said that it was Anderson, Elias, "and one other person" who made the final decision as to which parts were kept and replaced by someone else.

Wakeman criticised Elias for allowing the edits and overdubs, and the two addressed each other's issues in different publications of Keyboard magazine. Elias "never questioned Rick's technical ability" and stressed that Union was not an album of "major opuses" and felt Wakeman had "lost his edge". Elias ranked his time with Haun as his best experience during the making of the album. Howe called Haun an "average guitarist" and compared his changes to "having an abortion". Elias maintained the view that he and Anderson agreed that outside musicians were needed and described Howe's reaction as merely "bruised ego from someone who is a very good guitar player in his own right." Howe included the original backing tracks of "Dangerous" and "Without Hope You Cannot Start the Day" on his 2017 compilation Anthology 2: Groups & Collaborations.

Cover 
Roger Dean was hired to design the art for the album. After the release of Big Generator, Dean was asked by Phil Carson to design a new band logo, and came up with a square design, but it was not used due to Anderson forming ABWH. When it came to Union, Dean decided to use the Yes logo he designed in 1972, the square design appearing in the corner and on the subsequent Yesyears cover.

Songs

By ABWH 
"I Would Have Waited Forever" features Howe playing a guitar riff that he also used on "Sensitive Chaos" from his solo album Turbulence (1991). Haun later revealed that Howe plays a short, recurring thread and the ending solo, but all other electric, acoustic, and effect overdubs were in fact played by him, and that Arista wanted a guitar riff similar to that of "Starship Trooper" from The Yes Album (1971). Elias thought the track best represented "both early and later Yes styles".

Although Howe wrote the opening guitar riff to "Shock to the System", Haun re-recorded the part for "sonic reasons" and devised the other riffs as well, leaving no other parts that Howe had originally played. Some bass parts from Levin were also redone on his guitar during his time away from the studio. Haun described one of his riffs as reminiscent to "The Gates of Delirium" from Relayer (1974).

"Masquerade" is an acoustic guitar instrumental written and performed by Howe. He recorded the track in fifteen minutes at his home studio using a two-channel Revox deck, "away from all the arguments and politics" that came with making the album. He recorded other acoustic tracks on a Spanish guitar for the album, including one titled "Baby Georgia", but Arista decided to use "Masquerade", a track Howe ironically almost decided against sending because he thought it was not as strong as the others.

"Without Hope (You Cannot Start the Day)" originated from Elias, who recorded a basic outline of the track in one afternoon and sent the tape to Wakeman to add keyboards. Elias and Anderson felt dissatisfied with Wakeman's contribution; they had wished for something "simple and gentle" but instead got a part that to Elias "sounded like a Rachmaninoff piano concerto", and hence recorded a new piano part. Howe does not play on the track.

"Silent Talking" is a song that Howe wrote that originally connected with an instrumental called "Seven Castles". Howe thought it contained some of his better guitar playing on the album, but felt Anderson came in too soon with his vocals in the second half, after his solo began. Haun replaced what Howe had put down for the main guitar riff "because there were timing discrepancies", so he tried to get as close to Howe's sound as possible. Other riffs from Howe were kept on the track, and can be heard due to a slightly different guitar tone that Haun used. "Angkor Wat", named after the Cambodian temple of the same name, was written by Elias, Anderson and Wakeman. During Wakeman's final day of recording, Elias asked Wakeman to record some atmospheric keyboard sounds that were then layered and formed into a track. The track concludes with a poem recited in Cambodian. "Evensong" is a bass and percussion duet between Levin and Bruford and is named after an evening prayer service held in English churches.

By Yes 
"Lift Me Up" was written by Rabin and Squire. The two used a dictionary to look for suitable rhyming words for the song's lyrics, which is how they came up with the word "imperial" in its chorus. According to Rabin, the song concerns a homeless person who enters a restaurant just to use the bathroom, only to have the people inside telling him he has to leave. "And he just looks up to the sky [and says] ... you know, help me out". Rabin completed two different mixes of the track but Arista founder Clive Davis disliked them. After Squire suggested they bring in someone else, Paul Fox was hired and finished a mix with assistance from Ed Thacker that was used on the album. Rabin, feeling the original mix was superior, thought Fox and Thacker's work was "very good" but it suffered from them not having a clear idea of what Rabin had wanted.

Rabin felt "Saving My Heart" was not suitable for a Yes album, a feeling he had also had for "Owner of a Lonely Heart". He originally planned to develop the track with Roger Hodgson before Anderson heard it and wished to work on it for Union. The song displays a distinct reggae influence. Rabin was unhappy with the song's final mix as it did not turn out the way he had wished.

"Miracle of Life" is a track Rabin described as a protest song; the inspiration for its lyrics came from watching a news report on the slaughtering of dolphins in Denmark. Howe thought the track was "very good".

"The More We Live – Let Go" is the first song that Squire and Sherwood wrote together. Sherwood and 1970s Yes producer Eddy Offord wanted Squire to re-record the bass parts that Sherwood had played on the demo, but Squire felt that Sherwood's playing suited the song perfectly and insisted it be kept. To Sherwood, the writing and recording process was so successful, he and Squire agreed to continue writing together from then on. The pair also wrote "Love Conquers All", a track with Rabin on lead vocals and released on the Yesyears box set.

Release 
Union was released on 30 April 1991. The album was a success on the charts, reaching its peak of number seven on the UK Albums Chart in May 1991 during a six-week stay. In the United States, it debuted on the Billboard 200 chart at number 35, the week of 18 May 1991. The album climbed on the following week, reaching its peak at number 15 on the week ending 25 May. It was present on the chart for a total of 19 weeks.

On 2 July 1991, Union was certified gold by the Recording Industry Association of America (RIAA) for shipment of 500,000 copies.

In 1992, "Masquerade" received a Grammy Award nomination for Best Rock Instrumental Performance. Howe described the nomination for his track as "pure justice", following the difficulties in making the album.

Yes released three singles from Union in 1991. "Lift Me Up" was the lead single, released in April 1991. It became one of the band's most successful singles, spending six weeks at number one from its third week on the Billboard Album Rock Tracks chart, later known as the Mainstream Rock Tracks chart. It was number one from the week of 4 May to 8 June 1991. It reached a peak of 86 on the Billboard Hot 100 singles chart. The second single, "Saving My Heart", released in July 1991, reached a high of number nine on the Album Rock Tracks chart a month later. "I Would Have Waited Forever" was the final single released.

Reception 

The album received mixed reviews from critics. Chuck Eddy gave it two stars out of five for Rolling Stone, calling it "an eclectic miscarriage that almost isn't even worth laughing about", and wished the album had more memorable hooks, riffs, and concise lyrics. Q magazine issued a review from Robert Sandall, who thought Union "veers alarmingly between ... neurotically jumpy overarrangements and competing time signatures" from ABWH and "heads-down riffing" from the Yes members. Sandall picked out "Lift Me Up" as one of the few "strong, anthemic tunes" that remain "unscathed" from the collision of such varied styles, which makes Union "one of the least ridiculous Yes albums in recent memory". Dave DiMartino of Entertainment Weekly rated the album with a D+, and called it a "stunningly wicked parody of an outlandish concept", pointing out its "complete and utter unlistenability". In The Washington Post, Gil Grifin noted that "musically and conceptually", the band are "reaching for its glorious past" which resulted in an album not entirely appealing. Though "Lift Me Up", "The More We Live – Let Go" and "Saving My Heart" are picked as more favourable tracks, Grifin concludes with "the aloofness of 'Union' is often sleep-inducing". 

Union received two and a half stars out of five in a retrospective review by Bruce Eder for AllMusic. Eder thought it was always difficult for the album to live up to expectations given the amount of musical talent involved. Nevertheless, he judged its songs "reasonably solid", and cites the harmonies in "I Would Have Waited Forever" from Anderson and Squire and Howe's "Masquerade" as highlights. But he thought "Lift Me Up" is a "forced exercise in heaviness" and "Without Hope (You Cannot Start the Day)" a "composed-by-numbers" track. In his book The Music's All that Matters: A History of Progressive Rock, Paul Stump commented that "the music of Union, an unhappy testament to hubris, conceit and corporate expediency, unintentionally embodies all the crimes that had been (often mistakenly) laid at the band's door hitherto." He argued that the concept was flawed from the beginning, saying it was unrealistic to expect the band members to cooperatively produce an album of quality and subtlety given the history of strife between them. The music portal Ultimate Classic Rock ranked Union worst in its list of Yes albums.

Most of the band have negative opinions on the album. Wakeman stated he was dissatisfied with the production, commenting that most of his contributions were so altered in the final result that he could not recognise them, adding that he called the album Onion because "it made me cry every time I heard it". Rabin thought it lacked a linking thread and ranked 90125 and Big Generator as better. "I don't hate Union as much as Rick," he stated in 2016, "but it was a peculiar record. It was instigated by Clive Davis and made largely in isolation by the musicians and Jon, so the title is misleading. To me, Union is more of a failed project than a real album." Bruford remains very critical: "It was probably not only the most dishonest title that I've ever had the privilege of playing drums underneath, but the single worst album I've ever recorded."

Track listing 
Note: "Angkor Wat" and "Give & Take" are not included on the vinyl LP version.

Tour
The Union Tour covered North America, Europe, and Japan from 9 April 1991 to 5 March 1992, billed as Yesshows '91: Around the World in 80 Dates. It was the first rock tour produced by Philadelphia-based Electric Factory Concerts in its history which also organised advertising and promotion. The partnership evolved following discussions between Anderson and EFC head Larry Magid, who learned that Anderson had enjoyed how the ABWH concert in Philadelphia was presented. The tour featured the eight members playing on stage and some shows were performed in the round with a central revolving stage that the band had first used on their 1978 tour.

Unlike the album, most of the group have reflected positively on the tour. Wakeman ranked it as the most fun he had on a tour. Bruford, by contrast, said the tour was "ludicrous, really. For some of us, it was a very lucrative bit of fun; others needed it desperately." A live CD and DVD from various dates was released in 2011 as Union Live.

Yes reverted to the 1983–1988 line-up for their next album, Talk.

Personnel 
Yes
Jon Anderson – lead and backing vocals (all except tracks 3 and 13), production
Steve Howe – acoustic and electric guitars (tracks 1, 3, 8, 12 and 15), production (track 3)
Trevor Rabin – electric guitars, lead and backing vocals (tracks 4, 6, 7 and 9), production (tracks 4, 6, 7),  engineering (track 9)
Chris Squire – harmony and backing vocals (tracks 1, 2, 4-7, 9 and 11), bass (tracks 4, 6, 7)
Tony Kaye – Hammond B-3 organ, piano (tracks 4, 6, 7 and 9)
Rick Wakeman – keyboards (tracks 1, 2, 5, 8, 10–12, 14 and 15)
Bill Bruford – acoustic and electric drums, percussion (tracks 1, 2, 5, 8, and 11–15)
Alan White – acoustic drums and percussion (tracks 4, 6, 7 & 9)

Additional personnel

Jonathan Elias – piano (track 5), synthesizers/programming, backing vocals, production
Tony Levin – bass guitar (tracks 1, 2, 5, 8, 11, 12, 14 and 15), Chapman Stick (track 13)
Jimmy Haun – electric and acoustic guitars (tracks 1, 2, 5, 8, 11, 12, 14, 15)
Billy Sherwood – bass guitar, keyboards, backing vocals (track 9)
Allan Schwartzberg – acoustic percussion
Gary Barlough – synthesiser
Jerry Bennett – synthesiser, synth percussion
Jim Crichton – synthesiser (track 11)
Pauline Cheng – recitation (track 10)
Gary Falcone – backing vocals
Deborah Anderson – backing vocals
Ian Lloyd – backing vocals
Tommy Funderburk – backing vocals
Sherman Foote – synthesiser
Brian Foraker – synthesiser programming
Chris Fosdick – synthesiser
Rory Kaplan – synthesiser programming
Alex Lasarenko – synthesiser
Steve Porcaro – keyboards, synthesizer programming 
Michael Sherwood – backing vocals
Danny Vaughn – backing vocals

Technical personnel

Eddy Offord – producer, mixer (track 9)
Mark Mancina – producer, programming
Brian Foraker – engineer, mixer
Chris Fosdick – additional engineering (track 10)
Buzz Borrowes – assistant engineer
Sophie Masson – assistant engineer
Richard Edwards – assistant engineer
Renny Hill – assistant engineer
Matt Gruber – assistant engineer
Michael Sweet – assistant engineer
Paul Berry – assistant engineer
Steve Wellner – assistant engineer
Lolly Grodner – assistant engineer
Susan Kent – production co-ordinator
Paul Fox – mixer
Ed Thacker – mixer
Mike Shipley – mixer
Steve Harrison – assistant engineer
Stan Katayama – engineering
Greg Calbi – mastering
Roger Dean – design and paintings
Carolyn Quan – art director
Kai Krause – computer graphics

Chart performance

Certifications

References 
Citations

Bibliography

Yes (band) albums
1991 albums
Albums with cover art by Roger Dean (artist)
Arista Records albums
Albums produced by Jonathan Elias
Albums produced by Eddy Offord
Albums produced by Trevor Rabin
Albums produced by Billy Sherwood
Albums produced by Mark Mancina
Albums produced by Jon Anderson
Albums recorded at Studio Miraval